Samuel Hall (baptised 1782 – 21 November 1863) was an English inventor and engineer.

Life
Hall was the second son of Robert Hall, cotton manufacturer and bleacher, of Basford, Nottingham, where he was baptised on 17 March 1782. He was an elder brother of Marshall Hall, the physiologist. He took out patents in 1817 and 1823 for "gassing" lace and net, which consisted in passing the fabric rapidly through a row of gas flames, all the loose fibres being thus removed without damage to the lace. The process exercised an important influence upon the lace trade of Nottingham. It brought much wealth to the inventor, but he unfortunately dissipated his fortune in bringing out other inventions.

In 1838 Hall patented his "surface condenser", in which the steam is condensed by passing it through a number of small tubes cooled on the outside. It was chiefly intended for use at sea, and it was hoped that the difficulties attending the presence of salt in boilers would be obviated by charging them with fresh water at the start of a voyage and then recycling it. The invention was extensively tried out. In 1842 Sir Edward Parry  reported on behalf of the Admiralty that six of Hall's condensers had been fitted in steam packets; that they had given two to six years' service, but had then been removed, because their complexity made them difficult to keep in order. However, the principle of tubular condensers has subsequently been used generally for cooling purposes. His other patents, which number twenty in all, relate chiefly to steam engines and boilers. He died on 21 November 1863 in very reduced circumstances, in Tredegar Square, Bow.

References

Attribution
 

1782 births
1863 deaths
People from Basford, Nottinghamshire
English inventors